A Qualcuna Piace Calvo is a 1959 Italian film, directed by Mario Amendola, starring Magali Noël, Antonio Cifariello, Roberto Risso and Gisella Sofio.

Plot
Giovanna has taken an infatuation with a film actor who has a bald head as a particular sign. The star needs a person to help him deal with the correspondence of his numerous admirers. Giovanna doesn't think twice and, disguising herself as a man, she gets hired as a typist for her secretary. The actor decides to replace his old harpist; the young musician Marcella shows up at the announcement, but the place is reserved for men only. She too decides to dress up as a man and gets the job.

Cast
 Antonio Cifariello as Alberto Rossi
 Magali Noël as Marcella Salustri
 Roberto Risso as Renato Salustri
 Gisella Sofio as Giovanna
 Glamor Mora as Alicia Morena
 Tiberio Murgia as Rosario De Luca
 Rossana Rossanigo as  Lucia
 Alberto Sorrentino as Moreno
 Pupella Maggio as Madre di Marcella
  Lydia Johnson as Gertrude Robinson
 Giuseppe Porelli as Peppino
 Loretta Capitoli as Invitata
 Alfredo Rizzo as Agente
 Dina De Santis as Cameriera
 Enzo Garinei as Portiere d'albergo 
  Rhea Capparelli as Lolita
 Edda Ferronao as Invitata 
 Mario Carotenuto as Ispettore
 Tino Carraro as John Bryll
 Joe Sentieri as Cantante del Sing-Sing 
 Giuliano Gemma as Uomo in ascensore

Censorship 
When A Qualcuno Piace Calvo was first released in Italy in 1959, the Committee for the Theatrical Review of the Italian Ministry of Cultural Heritage and Activities approved the film for viewing provided that the scene in which the woman is wearing a revealing teddy and wiggling her hips voluptuously to draw the man's attention was removed. The official document number is: 30901, it was signed on 23 December 1959 by Minister Domenico Magrì.

References

External links
 
 A Qualcuna Piace Calvo at Variety Distribution

1959 films
Italian comedy films
1950s Italian films